Tuddenham is the name of several places:

 Tuddenham, in West Suffolk
 Tuddenham St Martin, in East Suffolk
 North Tuddenham, in Norfolk
 East Tuddenham, in Norfolk